Niels Hagenau (born 4 December 1943) is a Danish footballer. He played in five matches for the Denmark national football team in 1971.

References

External links
 

1943 births
Living people
Danish men's footballers
Denmark international footballers
Place of birth missing (living people)
Association footballers not categorized by position